The 1973 Men of the Midlands was a professional invitational snooker tournament, that took place in January and February 1973 The tournament was won by Alex Higgins, who defeated Ray Reardon 5–3 in the final.

The competition featured a round-robin group stage, with four world snooker champions, John Pulman, John Spencer, Reardon and Higgins each playing the other three once. Reardon finished on top of the group table.

In the final, Higgins won the first , making a break of 47, and Reardon won the next making a break of 45. Higgins won the next to lead 3–1. Reardon won the fifth frame, but Higgins achieved victory by winning the sixth frame with a break of 70 and going on to take the match 5–3.

The tournament was sponsored by Mitchells and Butlers. Higgins earned £500 prize money as champion.

Final

References

1973 in snooker
1973 in English sport
January 1973 sports events in the United Kingdom
February 1973 sports events in the United Kingdom